Pultenaea vestita, commonly known as feather bush-pea, is a species of flowering plant in the family Fabaceae and is endemic to south-western continental Australia. It is an erect to prostrate, sometimes mat-forming shrub with elliptic to linear or lance-shaped leaves, and yellow and red, pea-like flowers.

Description
The leaves are concave to channelled on the upper surface. Flowering occurs from November to January and the fruit is a slightly flattened pod.

Taxonomy
Pultenaea vestita was first formally described in 1811 by Robert Brown in William Aiton's Hortus Kewensis. The specific epithet (vestita) means "clothed", referring to the overlapping stipules.

Distribution and habitat
Feather bush-pea grows in forest, heathland and mallee in Western Australia around Esperance and in South Australia on the Yorke and  Eyre Peninsulas and on Kangaroo Island.

Conservation status
Pultenaea vestita is classified as "Priority Three" by the Government of Western Australia Department of Biodiversity, Conservation and Attractions, meaning that it is poorly known and known from only a few locations but is not under imminent threat.

References

vestita
Fabales of Australia
Flora of South Australia
Flora of Western Australia
Plants described in 1811
Taxa named by Robert Brown (botanist, born 1773)